Kázím Abdulakim (also transliterated in Romanian as: Kiazim Abdulachim, Kiazim Abdulakim or Chiazim Abdulachim) was a Crimean Tatar hero of the Romanian Army who lost his life in the summer of 1917 during the Battle of Mărășești during  World War I.

Second Lieutenant Kázím Abdulakim was the brother of lawyer Selim Abdulakim who, between the two wars, became a leading politician of the Crimean Tatars in Romania, Deputy Mayor of Constanța and a Member of the Romanian Parliament. Kázím’s sister Șefika, also known as Sapiye, was the wife of the beloved Crimean Tatar poet Memet Niyaziy.

As recognition of his extreme devotion to duty and his ultimate sacrifice, in Dobruja the Second Lieutenant Kázím Abdulakim Cultural and Sports Association was founded, and a street in downtown Constanța was named in Kázím’s honor.

See also
 Selim Abdulakim
 Memet Niyaziy
 Refiyîk Kadír

Citations

Sources

External links 
 

Crimean Tatar officers
Romanian Land Forces officers
Romanian military personnel killed in World War I
Romanian people of Crimean Tatar descent
People from Constanța
Year of birth missing
1917 deaths